SRM may refer to:

Organizations
 Schoberer Rad Meßtechnik, a manufacturer of bicycle accessories
 SRM University (disambiguation), several universities in India

In computing
 srm (Unix), a secure file deletion tool for POSIX systems
 Scalable Reliable Multicast, a framework for reliable multicast network protocols
 Single Round Match, an online algorithm competition
 Storage resource management, of a network
 Structural risk minimization, in machine learning
 System Reference Manual firmware, for DEC Alpha-based computers
 Security & risk management

In technology
 Solar radiation management (or solar radiation modification), the solar geoengineering technique
 Switched reluctance motor, a synchronous electric motor

In chemistry
 SRM Engine Suite, software for simulating chemical combustion within IC engines
 Selected reaction monitoring, a method for targeted, mass spectrometry-based quantitative proteomics
 Selective receptor modulator, a type of drug
 Specified risk material, animal tissue that may transmit  specific diseases
 Standard Reference Method, used to measure the relative darkness of a beer
 Standard Reference Material, a certified reference material that satisfies NIST-specific criteria

Other
 Supplier relationship management
 Single Resolution Mechanism of the EU's banking union
Wright SRM, a double-decker bus body manufactured by Wrightbus in Northern Ireland